Mountain Home Records is a record label based in Arden, North Carolina specializing in bluegrass music.

History
Crossroads was launched in 1984 as a recording studio, Tim Surrett and Mickey Gamble started Mountain Home as a subsidiary label in 1993 at first to release bluegrass gospel music. Soon the label broadened its scope to include secular music, as well.

At the 2014 International Bluegrass Music Association (IBMA) awards, Mountain Home artists received six awards. At the 2017 IBMA Awards, Mountain Home artists garnered 20 award nominations.

Pisgah Ridge Records, an imprint of Mountain Home Records established in 2012, is dedicated to special projects and development of new artists.

Artists
Here is a partial list of artists who have released recordings on the Mountain Home label. 
 Darin and Brooke Aldridge
 Balsam Range
 Kristin Scott Benson
 John Bowman
 The Boxcars
 Dale Ann Bradley
 Gina Clowes
 Flatt Lonesome
 The Grascals
 Joe Isaacs / Family and Friends
 David Johnson
 Mark Johnson
 Chris Jones and the Night Drivers
 Doyle Lawson and Quicksilver
 Lonesome River Band
 Michael Melito
 New Tradition
 Newfound Road
 NewTown
 Tony Rice
 Danny Roberts
 Rochesters
 Jerry Salley
 Larry Sparks
 Snyder Family Band
 Adam Steffey
 Donna Ulisse

See also 
 List of record labels

References

External links
 
 

American record labels
American independent record labels